Dinner in America is a 2020 American coming of age dark comedy film written, directed, and edited by Adam Carter Rehmeier. It stars Kyle Gallner, Emily Skeggs, Griffin Gluck, Pat Healy, Mary Lynn Rajskub, David Yow, Hannah Marks, Nick Chinlund, and Lea Thompson. The plot follows a punk rock singer seeking an escape and a young woman obsessed with his band who unexpectedly cross paths. The film premiered at the Sundance Film Festival on January 24, 2020. It was released in the United States on May 27, 2022. It received critical acclaim for its energy and the performances of the leads.

Plot
A reckless, on-the-lam punk rock singer named Simon goes home with Beth, a girl he met while volunteering at a clinical trial. He and Beth's mother begin to flirt, and after getting caught, Simon lights the family's front yard on fire. Meanwhile, track athletes Derrick and Brandon bully the young and awkward Patty, who goes to work at a pet store before returning home. She eats dinner with her parents, Norman and Connie, and brother Kevin, and is unsuccessful in asking for permission to go to a rock show with her friends, Sissy and Karen. For the past two years, Patty has been sending postcards containing nude photos and lyrics to her original music to John Q, the lead singer of her favorite band PSYOPS, who will be playing next week with the Alliance. She is unaware that John Q is Simon, who performs wearing a ski mask.

The following morning, Simon begins to sell drugs around town. A police officer spots him and gives chase but fails to find him. Simon crosses paths with Patty, who recognizes him from a college course on music appreciation. She tells him that she was just fired from the pet store by the owner, Mr. Hanley. She takes him back to her place, where they flirt. Simon and Patty later eat dinner with the rest of her family. Simon convinces Norman and Connie into giving him a place to stay for the week and tells Kevin he is adopted. Patty tells Simon about her fascination for John Q. Simon runs away and confronts his band members for setting up the rock show without his knowledge. He returns to Patty's house and smokes weed with Kevin.

The next day, Simon and Patty make plans to demand an overdue paycheck from Mr. Hanley. Derrick and Brandon come across them and beat up Simon. In a rage, Simon convinces a friend to lend him his truck. He goes home to retrieve a dead cat from Patty's front yard before tracking Derrick and Brandon down. Patty acts provocatively to throw them off as Simon knocks them unconscious, strips them, burns their tracksuits, and places the dead cat on their bodies. The smoke alerts the other track athletes, who find them as Simon and Patty make their escape and drive away. They get the check from Mr. Hanley and eat lunch at a fast food restaurant. There, they kiss passionately. Simon and Patty spend the rest of the day on a date at an arcade. Simon breaks into a ticket machine to win Patty a desired stuffed teddy bear. They return home and find the rest of Patty's family completely stoned.

The following day, Simon prevents Patty from going to a job interview to be a dish cleaner and instead takes her to the basement of his mother's house. He tells her that he is John Q and proves it by giving her back her postcards. He praises her songwriting abilities. They have sex and later perform one of her songs. Her singing brings him to tears. Simon's family arrives home and invites the pair to dinner. When the family starts to criticize Simon and accuse him of being a drug addict, Patty confronts them, but they mistake her awkwardness for drug use. The family kicks them both out. When Patty asks Simon if he thinks she is retarded, he tells her to stop undervaluing herself because she is a "total punk rocker." When Simon tells his music manager that he refuses to play with the Alliance, his band members decide to call the police and turn him in for a reward. Simon takes Patty on another date to a "secret" rock show. He sings one of her favorite songs, "Dinner in America," and dedicates the performance to her, cementing their relationship. The police arrest Simon as Sissy and Karen notice Patty kissing him before he goes. The trio decides to start a riot girl band. Sometime later, Patty reads a letter from Simon that includes a nude photo of his. She punches a bully that calls her a retard, walks away, puts on a ski mask, and listens to the song she recorded with Simon.

Cast

 Kyle Gallner as Simon, a punk rock singer
 Emily Skeggs as Patty, a young and awkward college dropout
 Griffin Gluck as Kevin, Patty's younger brother
 Pat Healy as Norman, Patty's father
 Mary Lynn Rajskub as Connie, Patty's mother
 David Yow as Eddie Sorvino, Simon's music manager
 Hannah Marks as Beth, Bill and Betty's daughter
 Nick Chinlund as Bill, Beth's father
 Lea Thompson as Betty, Beth's mother
 Sean Rogers as Bobby, Beth's brother
 Nico Greetham as Derrick, a track athlete and bully
 Lukas Jacob as Brandon, a track athlete and bully
 Sidi Henderson as Mr. Hanley, the pet store owner
 Brian Andrus as Honey Glaze
 Maryann Nagel as Nancy, Simon's mother
 Brittany Sheets as Sissy, Patty's friend
 Sophie Bolen as Karen, Patty's friend

Production
The concept for the film originated from two sketches by writer-director Adam Carter Rehmeier. The first sketch, Kicks (2006), centered entirely around Simon's time volunteering for clinical trials to pay for his punk records. Rehmeier wrote the second sketch, Dinner in America, around 2009, and took a more comedic approach that focused on Patty's family as they ate dinner. When he saw they were not working independently, he combined the stories together sometime between 2013 and 2014, and the idea for the film came to fruition. Rehmeier said the film drew inspiration from the characters of Dawn Wiener in Welcome to the Dollhouse (1995) and the title character in Napoleon Dynamite (2004): "I wouldn't say they were really direct [influences]. I think really it came down to writing things that weren't going anywhere and just having like a lot of marinating over a long period of time."

The screenplay was noticed by filmmaker Danny Leiner who, initially interested in directing, noticed Rehmeier's vision and came on board the project as a producer. The ensemble cast, including leads Kyle Gallner and Emily Skeggs, was announced in September 2018. Filming took place in Detroit, Michigan. Leiner died by the time production had concluded in 2018; the film is dedicated to his memory. Ben Stiller and Nicky Weinstock are credited in the end credits as producers as well. Leiner said he was thankful for their guidance, especially since Weinstock was on set the entire time. Skeggs, who plays Patty, said musician Ezra Furman was a major inspiration for her performance. Original songs for the film were constructed ahead of filming during pre-production. The score was composed by John Swihart.

Release

The film premiered at the Sundance Film Festival on January 24, 2020, as part of the U.S. Dramatic Competition. It was released in select theaters in the United States on May 27, 2022, by Best & Final Releasing, and on video-on-demand on June 7.

Reception

Critical response
On the review aggregator Rotten Tomatoes, 91% of 78 reviews are positive, with an average rating of 7.9/10. The critical consensus reads, "Rounded out by a pair of satisfying performances, Dinner in America is a coming-of-age rom-com with infectious punk rock energy." Metacritic, which uses a weighted average, assigned a score of 80 out of 100 based on 8 critics, indicating "generally favorable reviews".

Lorry Kikta of Film Threat hailed the performances from the ensemble cast as "fantastic" and said the screenplay was "hilarious and ingenious." Dennis Harvey of Variety called the film "surreal" and described Gallner's portrayal as "a knockout lead performance."

Accolades

References

External links

2020 black comedy films
2020 independent films
2020s coming-of-age comedy-drama films
American black comedy films
American coming-of-age comedy-drama films
American independent films
Films scored by John Swihart
Films shot in Detroit
Punk films
2020s English-language films
2020s American films